Bryodina is a genus of two species of crustose lichens in the family Lecanoraceae. It was circumscribed by Austrian lichenologist Josef Hafellner in 2001 as a segregate of the large genus Lecanora. It is distinguished from the morphologically similar genus Bryonora by the clearly separated hypothecium and excipulum, and by the thin-walled ascospores.

References

Lecanoraceae
Lichen genera
Lecanorales genera
Taxa described in 2001
Taxa named by Josef Hafellner